Ornelas may refer to:

People
 Aires de Ornelas e Vasconcelos (1875–1879), Roman Catholic Archbishop of Goa
 Arban Severin (née Arban Ornelas; born 1976), composer, musician, and film actress
 Fernando de Ornelas (born 1976), Venezuelan football player
 Hélder Ornelas, Portuguese long-distance runner
 Jaime Ornelas Camacho (1921–2016), Portuguese politician
 Jorge Ornelas (born 1991), Mexican footballer 
 Marta Domingo (née 1935), Mexican opera soprano, stage director and designer
 Nivaldo Ornelas, musician; see Nascimento
 Óscar Ornelas (1920–2000), Mexican lawyer and politician and member of Institutional Revolutionary Party

Other uses
 Ornelas v. United States (1996), a case decided by the Supreme Court of the United States